In the Japan Maritime Self-Defense Force (JMSDF), the Fleet Air Force is its naval aviation branch, responsible for both fixed-wing and rotary aircraft and headquartered in Naval Air Facility Atsugi. As of 2012, it was equipped with over 200 fixed-wing aircraft and 150 helicopters. These aircraft operate from bases throughout Japan, as well as from the JMSDF's ships.

History
The JMSDF's first aircraft were 16 Lockheed P2V Neptune maritime patrol aircraft, which were provided to the force by the United States Navy in 1956. The US Navy also provided Japan with 60 Grumman S-2 Trackers from 1957. During the 1980s, the JMSDFs force of 82 Neptunes (most of which were the locally built Kawasaki P-2J variant) was replaced by about 100 Lockheed P-3 Orions. The JMSDF's first combat helicopters were the Mitsubishi HSS-2 (the Japanese variant of the Sikorsky SH-3 Sea King). These helicopters were replaced by SH-60Js during the 1990s.

The JMSDF is the only force to operate minesweeping helicopters other than the US Navy. The first helicopters used for this purpose were eight V-107As. These helicopters were replaced by eleven MH-53Es during the 1990s. Seven MCH-101 helicopters have been ordered to replace the MH-53Es, of which five had been delivered by mid-2012.

The Diet of Japan approved the modification of the ships of the Izumo-class to operate STOVL aircraft and in 2019 ordered 42 STOVL Lockheed Martin F-35 Lightning IIs. The US Marine Corps will at first operate in cooperation their own F-35Bs to build up a Japanese capability to operate this type. The Asahi Shimbun quotes Japan’s Defense Minister Takeshi Iwaya “The Izumo-class aircraft carrier role is to strengthen the air defense in the Pacific Ocean and to ensure the safety of the Self-Defense Force pilots.” He also states, “There may be no runway available for the US aircraft in an emergency. I cannot say that the US F-35B should never be placed on an [JMSDF] escort vessel.”   The current plan is for the Japan Air Self-Defense Force to operate the aircraft once delivered.

Equipment
The Japan Maritime Self-Defense Force aviation maintains a large naval air force, including 201 fixed-wing aircraft and 145 helicopters. Most of these aircraft are used in anti-submarine warfare operations.

Current organization
The organization of the JMSDF's aviation units is based on that of the US Navy. The main organizational units are Koku Shudan (air groups), Kokugun (air wings), Kōkūtai (air squadrons) and Hikōtai (flights).

As at mid-2012, the structure of the JMSDF's aviation units was as follows:

Fleet Air Force (Atsugi Air Base)
Fleet Air Wing 1 (Kanoya Air Field)
Air Patrol Squadron 1 (P-3C Orion, Kawasaki P-1)
Maintenance and Supply Squadron 1
Air Station Squadron Kanoya
Fleet Air Wing 2 (Hachinohe Air Base)
Air Patrol Squadron 2 (P-3C Orion)
Maintenance and Supply Squadron 2
Air Station Squadron Hachinohe
Fleet Air Wing 4 (Atsugi Air Base)
Air Patrol Squadron 3 (Kawasaki P-1)
Maintenance and Supply Squadron 4
Air Station Squadron Atsugi
Air Station Iwoto
Auxiliary Air Facility Minamitorishima
Fleet Air Wing 5 (Naha Air Base)
Air Patrol Squadron 5 (P-3C Orion)
Maintenance and Supply Squadron 5
Air Station Squadron Naha
Fleet Air Wing 21  (Tateyama Air Base)
Air ASW Helicopter Squadron 21 (JMSDF Tateyama Air Base SH-60J/K)
Air ASW Helicopter Squadron 23 (JMSDF Maizuru Helipoat SH-60J/K)
Air ASW Helicopter Squadron 25 (JMSDF Ōminato Base  SH-60J/K)
Helicopter Rescue Squadron 73 (Tateyama Air Base UH-60J)
Helicopter Rescue Detachment Ominato 
Helicopter Rescue Detachment Iwoto
Maintenance and Supply Squadron 21
Air Station Squadron Tateyama
Fleet Air Wing 22  (Omura Air Base)
Air ASW Helicopter Squadron 22  (Omura Air Base SH-60J/K)
Air ASW Helicopter Squadron 24  (Komatsushima Air Base SH-60J/K)
Air Rescue Helicopter Squadron 72  (Omura Air Base UH-60J)
Helicopter Rescue Detachment Kanoya
Helicopter Rescue Detachment Tokushima
Maintenance and Supply Squadron 22
Air Station Squadron  Omura
Fleet Air Wing 31 (Iwakuni Air Base)
Air Rescue Squadron 71 (Atsugi Air Base US-1A, US-2)
Air Reconnaissance Squadron 81 (Iwakuni Air Base EP-3, OP-3C)
Air Training Support Squadron 91 (Iwakuni Air Base UP-3D, U-36A)
Maintenance and Supply Squadron 31
Drone Maintenance Squadron
Air Station Squadron Iwakuni
Air Development Squadron 51 (Atsugi Air Base)
Air Transport Squadron 61 (Atsugi Air Base C-130R, LC-90)
Mine Countermeasures Helicopter Squadron 111 (Iwakuni Air Base MCH-101)
Air Repair Squadron 1 (Kanoya Air Field)
Air Repair Squadron 2 (Hachinohe Air Base)
Air Control Service Group (Atsugi Air Base)
Mobile Construction Group (Hachinohe Air Base)

Units attached to Naval District destroyer fleets
Kure District Fleet
Komatsushima Air Squadron (SH-60J, Komatsushima Heliport)
Ōminato District Fleet
Ōminato Air Squadron (SH-60J, Ōminato Air Field)
Ōminato Flight (UH-60J)
Sasebo District Fleet
Ōmura Air Squadron (SH-60J, Ōmura Air Base)
Yokosuka District Fleet
Shirase Flight (SH-60J, Tateyama Air Base)

Air Training Command
Shimofusa Air Training Group (Shimofusa Air Base)
203 Air Training Squadron (P-3C)
205 Air Training Squadron (no aircraft)
Tokushima Air Training Group (Tokushima Airport)
202 Air Training Squadron (Beechcraft TC-90 King Air, Beechcraft UC-90 King Air)
Ozuki Air Training Group (Ozuki Air Field)
201 Air Training Squadron (Fuji T-5)
211 Air Training Squadron (OH-6D, OH-6DA, SH-60J, Eurocopter TH-135)

See also

 Imperial Japanese Navy Air Service

References

Aviation in Japan
Units and formations of the Japan Maritime Self-Defense Force
Military units and formations established in 1961
Japan